The 2007 Women's EuroHockey Nations Trophy was the second edition of the Women's EuroHockey Nations Trophy, the second level of the women's European field hockey championships organized by the European Hockey Federation. It was held from 2 to 9 September 2007 in Šiauliai, Lithuania.

Scotland won its first EuroHockey Nations Trophy title and were promoted to the 2009 EuroHockey Championship together with the runners-up Russia.

Qualified teams

Results

Preliminary round

Pool A

Pool B

Fifth to eighth place classification

Pool C
The points obtained in the preliminary round against the other team are taken over.

First to fourth place classification

Semi-finals

Third place game

Final

Final standings

See also
2009 Men's EuroHockey Nations Trophy
2009 Women's EuroHockey Nations Championship

References

Women's EuroHockey Championship II
EuroHockey Nations Trophy
Women 2
EuroHockey Nations Trophy
EuroHockey Nations Trophy
International women's field hockey competitions hosted by Lithuania
Sport in Šiauliai